Kolarian is a word first used by George Campbell. He described it as one of the three non-Aryan language families of India, which he made up, along with the Tibeto-Burman and the Dravidian. It is group of Munda languages of Austro-asiatic languages in India.

The following languages as belonging to the group:

 Bondo
 Gadaba
 Ho 
 Juang
 Kharia
 Korku 
 Korwa
 Mundari
 Santali
 Savara

References

Languages of India